The Simuliini is a tribe of black flies that contains over 2,000 species, with more than 1,800 in the genus Simulium. There are 19 living genera, and three genera only known from Cretaceous fossils.

Living genera
 Araucnephia Wygodzinsky & Coscarón, 1973
 Araucnephioides Wygodzinsky & Coscarón, 1973
 Austrosimulium Tonnoir, 1925
 Cnephia Enderlein, 1921
 Cnesia Enderlein, 1934
 Cnesiamima Wygodzinsky & Coscarón, 1973
 Crozetia Davies, 1965
 Ectemnia Enderlein, 1930
 Gigantodax Enderlein, 1925
 Greniera Doby & David, 1959
 Lutzsimulium D’Andretta & D’Andretta, 1947
 Metacnephia Crosskey, 1969
 Paracnephia Rubtsov, 1962
 Paraustrosimulium Wygodzinsky & Coscarón, 1962
 Pedrowygomyia Coscarón & Miranda-Esquivel, 1998
 Simulium Latreille, 1802
 Stegopterna Enderlein, 1930
 Sulcicnephia Rubtsov, 1971
 Tlalocomyia Wygodzinsky & Díaz Nájera, 1970

Fossil genera
 Archicnephia Currie & Grimaldi, 2000
 Baisomyia Kalugina, 1991
 Gydarina Kalugina, 1991

Literature cited

Simuliidae
Insect vectors of human pathogens
Nematocera tribes